Herttoniemi metro station is a ground-level station on the Helsinki Metro. It serves the district of Herttoniemi in East Helsinki. There are 193 bicycle and 148 car parking spaces at the station. Both lines M1 and M2 serve Herttoniemi.

As the station was opened on 1 June 1982, Herttoniemi is one of the system's original stations. It was designed by Jaakko Ylinen and Jarmo Maunula. It is located 1.4 kilometres from Kulosaari metro station and 1.4 kilometres from Siilitie metro station.

References

External links

Herttoniemi
Helsinki Metro stations
Railway stations opened in 1982
1982 establishments in Finland